Jeffrey Yong (born 29 November 1958) is a Malaysian Luthier best known for his use of local Malaysian wood, such as monkeypod, rengas, mango, rambutan and Malaysian blackwood. The use of non-traditional wood to build musical instruments has not only placed Jeffrey Yong guitars (JY Guitars) in international markets but also made him considered one of the top luthiers in the world. Yong has gained international recognition and has been invited to exhibit his instruments in several international conventions.

Biography 

Yong started out as a guitar instructor and examiner in 1976. His love of arts and music led to the building of his first maiden guitar in 1985 from a DIY kit. Yong traveled abroad to further improve his guitar-making skills. However, it all started when he was questioned by a local overseas luthier why he was sourcing material from overseas when Malaysia exports good quality wood. This conversation inspired him to look into non-traditional wood as building materials for musical instruments.

As an artisan who was reluctant to remain just another guitar-luthier, Yong continued to innovate and find his niche. Yong has constantly pushed himself to acquire other forms of knowledge and experiences which has led to his extensive knowledge in wood especially those in tropical regions.

He founded the Guitar Institute Malaysia (GIM) in 1993 specializing in teaching various genres of guitar playing and guitar construction. He has also taught at the Luthier School International in California. His skill in luthiery has been mostly self-taught. 
In 2006, his full monkeypod OM Guitar won the Blind Listening Test at the Guild of American Luthier's convention as the best sounding guitar in terms of tonality, timbre and sustain. With two of his guitars in the top three. Other's in this category were notable luthiers like, Erwin Somogyi.

Yong's guitars have been exhibited at Healdsburg Guitar Festival, Shanghai Music Festival, and Montreal Guitar Show. At the Montreal Guitar Show 2011, he premiered his JJ Blackie as well as his innovation "Seismic" a JJ shaped 10-string, (as shown in the picture above) which was featured by Premier Guitar Magazine.

Types of Non-Traditional Woods  

Malaysian Blackwood

- Jeffrey's extensive knowledge in woods has led to the introduction of the Malaysian Blackwood in international waters during the 1998 GAL convention in Tacoma, Washington, USA. Since the inception, the popularity of Malaysian Blackwood has grown tremendously. The Malaysian Blackwood carries many desirable qualities for musical instruments. Today, the Malaysia Blackwood has established it position firmly at the level of premium tonewoods in the musical instruments making industry.

Monkeypod Wood (Samanea saman or Rain Tree)

- Formally known as Albizia saman and previously only used for aesthetic purposes, monkeypod was pioneered as a tonewood by Jeffrey Yong and has recently been applied by other luthiers such as Bamburg guitars.

- Up to 99% of this guitar was built using hardwoods. Its presence at the 2006 GAL convention was evidently heard and felt during an acoustic guitar blind-test listening session. This non-conventional built has triumphed over the other acoustic guitars in the session. The tonal characteristic was unique and impressionable to everyone who was present. Eventually the audience has unanimously regarded the Monkeypod guitar as the one that possessed the most desired tonal characteristics.

- While using Monkeypod wood to build guitar is not new but it has never been regarded as a premium tonewood in the musical instruments making industry. The showdown in 2006's GAL convention has certainly illuminated its profile. The popularity of this unique wood has been never stopped growing since.

Guitar Models 
All instruments built in Jeffrey's workshop are made by hand excluding the regular hardware and electronic parts that are pre-purchased and installed. Jeffrey's guitars are made with 99 percent local woods, the remaining 1 percent accounts for the maple veneer used in the bindings. Monkeypod wood is used as a standard for all Jeffrey Yong guitars. The braces designs and layout are influenced by the Martin's X-scalloped braces patterns, Torres Fan bracing and the Smallman Lattice bracing.

Steel String Guitars
JJ (Jeffrey Jumbo) Guitar
Body shape is a cross between a Jumbo and a Classical Guitar.
OM Guitar
Seismic Guitar 
10-String Acoustic Guitar.
Presented it in Montreal Guitar Show in 2011. 
Influenced by the tragic March 2011 earthquake in Japan.
Body - Monkeypod 
Fretboard and bridge - Blackwood
Headstock - half-slotted, half-pegged design
Soundhole, back, and bottom strap button are appointed unevenly representative of a seismic shift. 
To get a chimey sound, its D and G strings have octave pairs, and the B and high E have unison strings.

Classical Guitars
Tioman I  (Nylon String)
Torres bracing and body design
Tioman II (Nylon String)
Torres body shape with modified lattice bracing 
Tioman III (Nylon String)
Khono design body shape (larger body) with modified lattice bracing

JJ (Jeffrey Jumbo) 
 
The JJ is a hybrid of a classical guitar and a jumbo, it has uses a scallop "x" bracing, and a unique bridge which offers more mass than the conventional bridge.

Other interesting features are:

Cutaway bevel offers more excess to higher frets without sacrificing air mass in the body.
Soundport to bring the in-body sound closer to the player.
Thumb Scallop helps the player utilise the over the thumb technique with ease.

List of Artists 
Don Alder

Farid Ali

Kent Nishimura

Hiroshi Masuda

Shun Ng

Wayan Balawan

Dan LaVoie

Okapi

References

2. https://web.archive.org/web/20120120222403/http://www.alliedlutherie.com/weekly4.htm
3. http://www.premierguitar.com/Magazine/Issue/2011/Sep/Masterpieces_From_Montreal_Montreal_Guitar_Show_2011.aspx?Page=4
4.  http://www.shunng.com
5. http://thestar.com.my/metro/story.asp?file=/2009/7/29/central/4318755&sec=central
6. http://www.vintageandrare.com/builder/Jeffrey-Yong-Guitars-508
7. http://www.premierguitar.com/Magazine/Issue/2011/Jul/GALLERY_Montreal_Guitar_Show_2011.aspx?Page=17&

External links 
 The Official Jeffrey Yong Guitars Website
 The Official Shun Ng Website

Living people
1957 births
Malaysian luthiers
People from Kuala Lumpur